Morane may refer to:

 Morane, an uninhabited atoll in French Polynesia
 Morane-Borel, a French aircraft manufacturer
 Morane-Saulnier, a French aircraft manufacturer
 Bob Morane, a fictitious character of novelist Henri Vernes
 Robert and Léon Morane, the brothers who, together with Raymond Saulnier, founded the Morane-Saulnier Aircraft Company